This is a list of cities, towns, villages and hamlets in the counties of the East Riding of Yorkshire, North Yorkshire, South Yorkshire and West Yorkshire.

A

 Aberford, Acaster Malbis, Acaster Selby, Acklam (Middlesbrough), Acklam (Ryedale), Acomb, Addingham, Adel, Adlingfleet, Adwick le Street, Agbrigg, Agglethorpe, Aike, Ainderby Quernhow, Ainderby Steeple, Ainthorpe, Aire View, Airmyn, Airton, Aiskew, Aislaby (Ryedale), Aislaby (Scarborough), Akebar, Aldborough, Aldbrough, Aldbrough St John, Aldfield, Aldwark, Allerston, Allerthorpe, Allerton, Allerton Mauleverer, Almondbury, Alne, Altofts, Alverthorpe, Amotherby, Ampleforth, Angram (Harrogate), Angram (Richmondshire), Anlaby, Anlaby Common, Anston, Appersett, Applegarth, Appleton Roebuck, Appleton Wiske, Appleton-le-Moors, Appleton-le-Street, Appletreewick, Ardsley, Arkendale, Arkle Town, Arksey, Armthorpe, Arncliffe, Arnold, Arram, Arrathorne, Arthington, Asenby, Askham Bryan, Askham Richard, Askrigg, Askwith, Asselby, Aston, Athersley, Atley Hill, Atwick, Aughton (East Riding of Yorkshire), Aughton (South Yorkshire), Austonley, Austwick, Aysgarth, Azerley

B
 Bagby, Baildon, Bainbridge, Bainton, Baldersby St James, Balkholme, Bardsey, Barkerend, Barlby, Barmby Moor, Barmby on the Marsh, Barmston, Barkston Ash, Barnsley, Barugh, Barugh-Green, Barwick-in-Elmet, Batley, Battersby, Beal, Beamsley, Bedale, Beeford, Beggarington, Beggarington Hill, Beighton, Belby, Bell Busk, Bellasize, Bempton, Beningbrough, Bennetland, Benningholme, Bentley, Berry Brow, Bessacarr, Bessingby, Beswick, Beverley, Bewholme, Bielby, Bilbrough, Billingley, Bilton (East Riding of Yorkshire), Bilton (Harrogate), Bilton-in-Ainsty, Bingley, Binsoe, Birdsedge, Birdwell, Birkby, Birstall, Birstwith, Bishop Burton, Bishop Wilton, Blacktoft, Blubberhouses, Bolton, Bolton on Dearne, Boothferry, Boothtown, Booze, Boroughbridge, Borrowby (Hambleton), Borrowby (Scarborough), Boston Spa, Bottom Boat, Boulderclough, Bouthwaite, Boynton, Bradford, Bradley, Braithwell, Bramham, Bramham cum Oglethorpe, Bramhope, Bramley, Leeds, Bramley, South Yorkshire, Brampton, Brampton-en-le-Morthen, Brandesburton, Brantingham, Brayton, Breighton, Bridge Hewick, Bridlington, Brierley, Brigham, Brighouse, Brind, Brinsworth, Broadgate, Brockholes, Brokes, Broomfleet, Brotherton, Brough, Broughton, Buckden, Buckton, Bubwith, Bugthorpe, Burley, Burley-in-Wharfedale, Burley Woodhead, Burnby, Burneston, Burnsall, Burnt Yates, Bursea, Burshill, Burstwick, Burton Agnes, Burton Constable, Burton Fleming, Burton Leonard, Burton Pidsea, Burton Salmon, Buttercrambe.

C
 Calcutt, Calverley, Camblesforth, Camerton, Canklow, Carcroft, Carlecotes, Carleton, Carlton in Cleveland, Carlton (Richmondshire), Carlton (Selby), Carlton Husthwaite, Carlton Miniott, Carnaby, Carr Gate, Cartworth, Castle Bolton, Castleford, Castleton, Catcliffe, Catfoss, Catterick, Catwick, Cawthorne, Cawood, Cherry Burton, Church End, Churwell, Clayton (South Yorkshire), Clayton (West Yorkshire), Cleckheaton, Clifton (Doncaster), Clifton (Rotherham), Clifton (West Yorkshire), Clifton (York), Cold Kirby, Conisbrough Coniston, Conistone, Cononley, Constable Burton, Copley, Copt Hewick, Cotness, Cottam, Cottingham, Countersett, Cowden, Cowlam, Cowling (Craven), Cowling (Hambleton), Coxwold, Crambe, Cranswick, Cray, Crofton, Croome, Cropton, Crossflatts, Cross Hills, Cubeck, Cubley, Cudworth, Cundy Cross

D
Dallowgill, Dalton (South Yorkshire), Dalton (West Yorkshire), Damems, Danby, Danby Wiske, Danthorpe, Darfield, Darton, Denby Dale, Denholme, Denton, Dewsbury, Dinnington, Dodworth, Doncaster, Dore, Drewton, Driffield, Drighlington, Dringhoe, Drub, Dunnington, Dunford Bridge, Dunswell

E
 Earby, Easington (East Riding of Yorkshire), Easington (North Yorkshire), Easingwold, East Ardsley [Near Wakefield], East Barnby, East Cottingwith, East Cowick, East Knapton, East Newton, Eastburn, Eastrington, East Rigton, Eccleshill, Edlington, Egton, Egton Bridge, Elland, Ellerker, Ellerton (East Riding), Ellerton (near Catterick, North Yorkshire), Ellerton (in Swaledale, North Yorkshire), Elloughton, Elmswell, Elsecar, Elstronwick, Embsay, Emley, Emmotland, Eppleworth, Eryholme, Eske, Eston, Etherdwick, Etton, Everingham, Everthorpe

F
 Fangfoss, Farnhill, Farnley (North Yorkshire), Farnley (West Yorkshire), Farsley, Faxfleet, Featherstone, Felixkirk, Fewston, Filey, Fimber, Firbeck, Fitling, Flamborough, Flinton, Flockton, Flockton Green, Foggathorpe, Fordon, Foston on the Wolds, Fountainhead Village, Foxholes, Fox Royd, Fraisthorpe, Frickley, Fridaythorpe, Full Sutton, Fulwood, Fylingdales

G
 Ganstead, Gardham, Garforth, Gargrave, Garrowby, Garton, Garton on the Wolds, Gawber, Gawthorpe (Kirklees), Gawthorpe (Wakefield), Gembling, Giggleswick, Gilberdyke, Gildersome, Gildingwells, Gilling East, Gilling West, Gilroyd, Girsby, Glasshouses, Glusburn, Goathland, Goldsborough (Harrogate), Goldsborough (Scarborough), Goldthorpe, Goodmanham, Goole, Gowdall, Gowthorpe, Goxhill, Gransmoor, Grassington, Greasbrough, Great Ayton, Great Cowden, Great Givendale, Great Hatfield, Great Houghton, Great Kelk, Green Hammerton, Greenhow Hill, Grenoside, Grewelthorpe, Gribthorpe, Grimethorpe, Grimston, Grindale, Grosmont, Guisborough, Guiseley, Gunby

H
 Hackenthorpe, Hainworth, Haisthorpe, Halifax, Halsham, Hambleton (Craven), Hambleton (Selby), Harden, Harecroft, Harley, Harlthorpe, Harehills, Harehills Corner, Harmby, Harpham, Harrogate, Harswell, Harthill, Hartshead, Hasholme, Hatfield, Hawes, Haworth, Haxby, Hayton, Hazlewood, Hebden, Hebden Bridge, Heckmondwike, Hedon, Hellaby, Hellifield, Helme, Helmsley, Helwith, Hemingbrough, Hempholme, Hemsworth, Hensall, Heptonstall, Hepworth, Herringthorpe, Heslington, Hessay, Hessle, Heworth, Hickleton, Highgate, High Birkwith, High Catton, High Gardham, High Green (Kirklees), High Green (Sheffield), High Hoyland, High Hunsley, Higham, Hightown, Hilston, Hive, Hollym, Holme, Holme on the Wolds, Holme-on-Spalding-Moor, Holmfield, Holmfirth, Holmpton, Honeywell, Honley, Hood Green, Hook, Hooton Pagnell, Horbury, Hornby, Hornsea, Horsforth, Hotham, Houghton, Hovingham, Howden, Howdendyke, Hoyland, Hoylandswaine, Hoyland Common, Hubberholme, Huddersfield, Huggate, Hull, Hull Bridge, Humbleton, Hunmanby, Hunslet, Huntington, Hunton, Husthwaite, Hutton Buscel, Hutton Cranswick, Hutton Rudby

I
 Idle, Ilkley, Ilton, Ingbirchworth, Ingleby Arncliffe, Ingleby Barwick, Ingleby Cross, Ingleton, Ingrow,

J
 Jagger Green, Jaw Hill, Jump

K
 Kearton, Keighley, Kelleythorpe, Kendray, Kettleness, Kettlewell, Kexbrough, Kexby, Keyingham, Kildwick, Kilham, Kilnhurst, Kilnsea, Kilnsey, Kilnwick, Kilnwick Percy, Kilpin, Kilpin Pike, Kimberworth, Kimberworth Park, Kingstone, Kingston upon Hull, Kinsley, Kiplingcotes, Kippax, Kirby Grindalythe, Kirby Misperton, Kirby Underdale, Kirk Deighton, Kirk Ella, Kirkburn, Kirkbymoorside, Kirkheaton, Kirkleatham, Kirklington, Kiveton Park, Knapton, Knaresborough, Knedlington, Knottingley

L
Laisterdyke, Land of Nod, Lane, Langsett, Langtoft, Laughton Common, Laughton-en-le-Morthen, Laverton, Laxton, Laytham, Lealholm, Leconfield, Leeds, Lelley, Leppington, Lepton, Letwell, Leven, Levisham, Levitt Hagg, Leyburn, Lightcliffe, Linthorpe, Linthwaite, Lissett, Little Catwick, Little Driffield, Little Hatfield, Little Houghton, Little Kelk, Little London, Little Preston, Little Reedness, Littletown, Little Weighton, Liversedge, Lockington, Lockton, Lofthouse (North Yorkshire), Lofthouse (West Yorkshire), Loftus, Londesborough, Londonderry, Long Riston, Long Preston, Lothersdale, Low Catton, Lowthorpe, Low Worsall, Luddenden, Lund, Lundwood

M
 Malham, Maltby, Malton, Manningham, Manvers, Mappleton, Mapplewell, Market Weighton, Marsden, Marske-by-the-Sea, Marton, Meaux, Melbourne, Melmerby (Harrogate), Melmerby (Richmondshire), Meltham, Melton, Meltonby, Menston, Metham, Methley, Mexborough, Micklebring, Micklefield, Middlecliffe, Middleham, Middlesbrough, Middlesmoor, Middlethorpe (East Riding of Yorkshire), Middlethorpe (North Yorkshire), Middleton (Craven), Middleton (Harrogate), Middleton (Ryedale), Middleton (West Yorkshire), Middleton on the Wolds, Millbridge, Millhouses, Millhouse Green, Millington, Mirfield, Mixenden, Molescroft, Monk Bretton, Moor Monkton, Morley, Morthen, Muker, Mytholmroyd

N
 Nafferton, Nesfield, Nether Poppleton, Nether Silton, Netherthong, Nettleton Hill, New Earswick, New Edlington, New Ellerby, New Farnley, New Lodge, New Mill, New Village, New York, Newbiggin (Askrigg), Newland (Eastrington), Newland (Kingston upon Hull), Newport, Newsholme, Newton upon Derwent, Noblethorpe, Normanby, Normanton, Norristhorpe, Northallerton, Norton-on-Derwent, North Cave, North Cliffe, North Dalton, North Duffield, North Ferriby, North Frodingham, North Howden, North Newbald, North Rigton, Northowram, Norton-on-Derwent, Nosterfield, Notton, Nun Monkton, Nunburnholme, Nunkeeling, Nunthorpe

O
Oakenshaw (West Yorkshire), Oakworth, Octon, Old Edlington, Old Ellerby, Old Lindley, Oldtown, Ormesby, Osgodby (Scarborough, North Yorkshire), Osgodby (Selby, North Yorkshire), Osmotherley, Ossett, Otley, Ottringham, Oughtibridge, Ousefleet, Ousethorpe, Out Newton, Outwood, Ovenden, Overthorpe, Overton, Owsthorpe, Owstwick, Oxenhope, Oxspring

P
 Painsthorpe, Pannal, Parkgate, Pateley Bridge, Patrington, Patrington Haven, Paull, Penistone, Pickering, Pickhill, Pilley, Platts Common, Pocklington, Pollington, Pontefract, Portington, Potto, North Yorkshire, Pool-in-Wharfedale, Preston, Preston-under-Scar, Primrose Valley, Pudsey,

Q
 Queensbury

R
 Rainton, Ramsgill, Rawcliffe, Rawcliffe Bridge, Ravenfield, Ravenscar, Rawdon, Rawmarsh, Raywell, Redcar, Redmire, Reedness, Reighton, Richmond, Riddlesden, Rievaulx, Rimswell, Riplingham, Ripon, Risby, Rise, Roberttown, Robin Hood's Bay, Roecliffe, Rolston, Rookwith, Roos, Rossington, Rotherham, Rothwell, Rotsea, Routh, Rowley, Roxby, Roydhouse, Royston, Rudston, Runswick Bay, Ruston, Ruston Parva, Ruswarp, Ryecroft (South Yorkshire), Ryecroft (West Yorkshire), Ryehill,

S
 Salt End, Saltaire, Saltburn-by-the-Sea, Saltmarshe, Sancton, Sandholme, Sandsend, Satron, Sawdon, Scalby (East Riding of Yorkshire), Scaling, Scalby (North Yorkshire), Scarborough, Scarcroft, Scawsby, Scawton, Scholes (South Yorkshire), Scholes (Cleckheaton, West Yorkshire), Scholes (Holme Valley, West Yorkshire), Scholes (Leeds, West Yorkshire), Scorborough, Scorton, Scotton (Harrogate), Scotton (Richmondshire), Seamer (Hambleton), Seamer (Scarborough), Seaton, Seaton Ross, Sedbergh, Selby, Settle, Sewerby, Shafton, Sheffield, Shelf, Shibden, Shipley, Shiptonthorpe, Sigglesthorne, Silkstone, Silkstone Common, Silpho, Silsden, Sinnington, Skeeby, Skeffling, Skelton, Skelton-on-Ure Skerne, Skidby, Skipsea, Skipsea Brough, Skipton, Skipwith, Skirlaugh, Skirlington, Skirpenbeck, Slaithwaite, Sledmere, Sleights, Smithies, Snainton, Snaith, Sneaton, South Bank, South Cave, South Cliffe, South Dalton, South Hiendley, South Newbald, South Ossett, Southburn, Southowram, Sowerby (North Yorkshire), Sowerby (West Yorkshire), Sowerby Bridge, Spaldington, Spaunton, Speeton, Spennithorne, Spofforth, Sproatley, Sproxton, Spurn Head, Stainburn, Stainland, Staincross, Stainsacre, Staintondale, Stairfoot, Staithes, Stamford Bridge, Stanbury, Stanley, Starbeck, Staxton, Steeton, Stean, Stocksbridge, Stockton-on-the-Forest, Stokesley, Storwood, Strensall, Suffield, Summerbridge, Sunderlandwick, Sutton Bank, Sutton-in-Craven, Sutton-on-Hull, Sutton-on-the-Forest, Sutton-under-Whitestonecliffe, Sutton upon Derwent, Swallownest, Swanland, Swillington, Swine, Swinefleet, Swinton (Harrogate), Swinton (Rotherham), Swinton (Ryedale)

T
Tadcaster, Tankersley, Tansterne, Teesville, Templeborough, Terrington, Thackley, Thearne, Thirn, Thirsk, Thirtleby, Thornaby-on-Tees, Thornbury (West Yorkshire), Thorncliffe, Thorne, Thorner, Thorngumbald, Thornholme, Thornton (West Yorkshire), Thornton (East Riding of Yorkshire), Thornton Dale, Thornton-in-Craven, Thornton in Lonsdale, Thornton-le-Clay, Thornton-le-Moor, Thornton-le-Street, Thornton-on-the-Hill, Thornton Rust, Thornton Steward, Thornton Watlass, Thorpe, Thorpe Edge, Thorpe le Street, Thorpe Hesley, Thorpe Salvin, Thorpe Willoughby, Threshfield, Thrintoft, Thrybergh, Thunder Bridge, Thurcroft, Thurgoland, Thurlstone, Thurnscoe, Thwing, Tibthorpe, Tickhill, Tickton, Tingley, Todmorden, Todwick, Tollingham, Tong, Towthorpe (East Riding of Yorkshire), Towthorpe (York), Treeton, Tunstall (East Riding of Yorkshire), Tunstall (North Yorkshire), Tyersal.

U
 Uckerby, Ugthorpe, Ulleskelf, Ulley, Ulrome, Ulshaw Bridge, Uncleby, Upper Poppleton, Upperthong

V
 Vale of Pickering, Vale of York

W
Wakefield, Walden, Wales, Walkington, Wansford, Waplington, Ward Green, Warter, Wassand, Wath (near Ripon), Wath (Ryedale), Wath-in-Nidderdale, Wath upon Dearne, Watton, Wauldby, Wawne, Waxholme, Weel, Weeton (East Riding of Yorkshire), Weeton (North Yorkshire), Welhambridge, Welton, Welwick, Wentworth, West Ardsley, West Ayton, West Barnby, West Burton, West Cowick, West Ella, West Hauxwell, West Knapton, West Melton, West Newton, Wetherby, Wetwang, Wheldrake, Whiston, Whitby, Whitgift, Whitley, Whitwell-on-the-Hill, Wickersley, Wigginton, Wigglesworth, Wigtwizzle, Wilberfoss, Wilfholme, Willerby, Willitoft, Wilsden, Wilsill, Wilsthorpe, Wilthorpe, Winestead, Winterburn, Wistow, Withernsea, Withernwick, Wold Newton, Woodale, Woodhall, Woodmansey, Woolley Colliery, Wombwell, Woodsetts, Wortley, Worsbrough, Worton, Wrelton, Wressle, Wykeham (Ryedale), Wykeham (Scarborough), Wyton

Y
 Yafforth, Yapham, Yarm, Yeadon, Yearsley, Yedingham, Yockenthwaite, Yokefleet, York, Youlthorpe, Youlton

See also
 List of civil parishes in the East Riding of Yorkshire
 List of civil parishes in North Yorkshire
 List of civil parishes in South Yorkshire
 List of civil parishes in West Yorkshire
 List of places in England

Places
 
 
Yorkshire
Pla